The Oblates of St. Frances of Rome (in latin:  Congregatio Oblatarum Turris Speculorum) are a monastic community in Rome of women oblates founded by St. Frances of Rome in 1433 to provide for a life of prayer and service among the wealthier women of the city. The group quickly developed a life in common, without monastic vows, committed to prayer and service to the poor of the city. They still continue today in this way of life here at their one and only monastery.

Origins

St. Frances (1378-1440) was a native and noblewoman of the city who had wanted to be a nun when she was a child. Despite being compelled to enter into an arranged marriage with a wealthy and aristocratic member of the papal military forces, she and her husband were happily married. However, the couple were not spared personal suffering, losing two young children to the various plagues which afflicted the city at that time. It was a time of famine, war, looting, and epidemics in Rome, due in large part, to the neglect it suffered during the period of the Great Schism within the Roman Catholic Church, as three separate cardinals established themselves as the legitimate pope, two of whom were based in France.

Through their losses, Frances became aware of the suffering of the general populace in the city. Already a pious and devout wife, she recruited other noble wives to join in caring for the poor and the sick. She and her sister-in-law would frequent the various hospitals of Rome, nursing the sick and distributing food to the hungry. Gradually, her longheld desire for monastic life developed into a desire to unite this with the service of the poor. Finally in 1425 she decided that she would henceforth live in celibacy, receiving the consent she needed from her husband for this step. 

On August 15th, she and nine companions made monastic oblation at the Olivetan Monastery attached to the Church of Santa Maria Nova. They took no vows, nor did they wear a special religious habit, but placed themselves under the spiritual direction of the Olivetan Benedictines. As Benedictine oblates, they continued to live their regular lives with their families, in addition to which they followed a regimen of prayer and service. Frances herself continued to live with her husband till his death in 1436.

Within a few years some of the women desired to live a life in common, where they could more easily practice spiritual exercises and be freer to commit themselves to the poor. This was already widespread in Rome for men and women who belonged to the Third Order of St. Francis and other new spiritual movements. Those among the oblates so inclined could live a common life there, according to their Benedictine spirituality. Those who did enter this community, however, were not to be bound by monastic vows, as nuns would be. In this way, they would be free to pursue their service to the poor out in the streets and hospitals of the city.

Frances was inspired to name St. Paul, St. Benedict and St. Mary Magdalen as the patron saints of the new community. In the early days, there were four members. They continued to live without vows, but otherwise lived a typical monastic life of prayer and manual labor. The monastery received papal approval on July 4th of that same year. Thus they formed an innovative form of religious life for the period, neither cloistered nuns nor laity. St. Frances joined them upon the death of her husband in 1436, becoming the president of the community, a post she held till her death four years later.

The Oblates were not formally recognized as religious sisters, however, until a special decree of Pope John XXIII in 1958, by which he commanded that the form of commitment taken by the Oblates was to be acknowledged as canonical vows.

Monastery of Tor de' Specchi

The Monastery of Tor de' Specchi (literally "Tower of the Mirrors") is the home of the Oblates of St. Frances of Rome. Located in the heart of the city, it was established on 25 March 1433, the Feast of the Annunciation. 

Frances acquired a house near the Campidoglio, next to the now no-longer existing church of Sant'Andrea dei Funari (later called Sant'Andrea in Vincis). This stood in the shade of the fortified tower built by the Specchi family, from which the name of the house comes. The atrium was originally a stable with an old manger, the lid of a large Roman sarcophagus, which Frances used to distribute food and clothing to the poor.

The chapel is decorated with frescoes by Antoniazzo Romano depicting scenes from the life of Frances. It is open to the public each year on her feast day, Match 9.

Present day
The community still lives in the basic pattern established at their founding. They follow a basic monastic routine and offer a ministry of hospitality in the heart of the city of Rome. Instead of the standard three vows, they promise obedience to the president of the community, and not to depart, should they chose to do so, in a way which might disrupt the lives of the community.  It remains the only house of the community.

The Oblates engage in daily common prayer and acts of charity to the poor and the unfortunate. A particular devotion to the Virgin Mary, to the guardian Angel and the service to the Church of Rome are characteristics of the congregation. As of 2017, there were six sisters in residence.

The Agnus Dei  
By special privilege, the Sisters of Tor de' Specchi are the only ones permitted to create an item of special papal significance. It is a small wax image of Christ as the Lamb of God. This is presented by the pope as a token of honor to those whom the Holy See wishes to recognize as having given notable service to the Church. They are blessed during Holy Week and distributed at Easter.

See also
Order of St. Benedict
Olivetans

References

External links
Tor de'Specci, Monastery of the Oblates of St. Frances of Rome   and a more limited version  
Address of Pope Benedict XVI on the occasion of his visit to the Oblate Sisters, 9 March 2009
website of the Oblates of St. Frances of Rome "History of the Monastery" 

Communities of Oblates Regular
Christian religious orders established in the 15th century
History of Catholic monasticism
Monasteries in Rome
History of Catholic religious orders
Catholic female orders and societies